The 1984 Scheldeprijs was the 71st edition of the Scheldeprijs cycle race and was held on 31 July 1984. The race was won by Ludo Peeters.

General classification

References

1984
1984 in road cycling
1984 in Belgian sport